Tinky Ho Nam Wai (born 30 April 2002) is a Hong Kong swimmer that participated in the 2021 Tokyo olympics. She competed in the 800 metre  and 1500 metre freestyle event at both 2017 and 2019 World Aquatics Championships, finishing 31st and 20th in 2017, and 30th and 25th in 2019 respectively. She also competed in 2018 Hangzhou and 2022 Melbourne short course world championships.

References

External links
 

2002 births
Living people
Place of birth missing (living people)
Swimmers at the 2018 Asian Games
Medalists at the 2018 Asian Games
Asian Games bronze medalists for Hong Kong
Asian Games medalists in swimming
Hong Kong female freestyle swimmers
Swimmers at the 2020 Summer Olympics
Olympic swimmers of Hong Kong